Riley Charles Warland (born 4 July 2002) is an Australian professional footballer who plays as a centre-back.

Club career
Warland joined the youth academy of Perth Glory as a ten-year-old. In August 2018, he left Australia to join English side Fulham on a three-year contract. After a year with Fulham, in which he made nine appearances in U18 Premier League, he returned to Perth Glory in October 2019. He made his senior debut in July 2020 playing for Perth Glory NPL in National Premier Leagues Western Australia On 20 January 2021, he made his professional debut, coming on as a second-half substitute in a 5–3 victory over Adelaide United. On 6 July 2021, Warland agreed a two-year deal with Newcastle Jets.

International career
Warland has represented Australia at under-15 level, having been part of the squad who finished third in the 2017 AFF U-15 Championship. He scored during a 8–0 group stage victory over Singapore.

Career statistics

References

External links
NPL stats

Living people
2002 births
Australian soccer players
Association football defenders
Australia youth international soccer players
Perth Glory FC players
Fulham F.C. players
Newcastle Jets FC players
A-League Men players
National Premier Leagues players